Vilcashuamán or Vilcasguaman (from Quechua Willka Waman, "sacred hawk") is the capital of Vilcas Huamán Province, Ayacucho region, Peru. It is located at an altitude of 3,490 m on the eastern slopes of the Andes. It is located on an ancient archaeological site.

Vilcashuamán was an Inca administrative center, established after the Incas conquered the Chancas and the Pocras. According to chroniclers, Vilcashuamán was home to 40,000 people. The city was located around a large plaza where ceremonies involving sacrifices were performed, usually camelids or libation of corn wine. Around this plaza were the city's two most important buildings: the Sun Temple (Templo del Sol) and the Usnu which remain to this day. It is believed that the city had the shape of a falcon, in which the Usnu was located in the head.

The Usnu is a truncated pyramid which is accessed through a double doorjamb, characteristic of the most important compounds. In its upper platform is a large stone with unique carvings that is known as the Seat of the Inca (Asiento del Inca); it is believed to have once been covered with gold leaf.

Populated places in the Ayacucho Region
Temples of Inti
Archaeological sites in Peru
Inca Empire
Archaeological sites in Ayacucho Region